United Methodist Church and Parsonage may refer to:

 Gray Memorial United Methodist Church and Parsonage, Caribou, Maine
 United Methodist Church and Parsonage (Mount Kisco, New York)
 Warren United Methodist Church and Parsonage, Warren, Rhode Island